13 Minutes is a 2015 German drama film directed by Oliver Hirschbiegel that tells the true story of Georg Elser's failed attempt to assassinate Adolf Hitler in November 1939. The title of the film is drawn from the fact that Elser's bomb detonated in a venue that Hitler had left just 13 minutes before.

It was screened out of competition at the 65th Berlin International Film Festival. It was one of eight films shortlisted by Germany to be their submission for the Academy Award for Best Foreign Language Film at the 88th Academy Awards, but it lost out to Labyrinth of Lies.

Plot
In November 1939, after planting a home-made bomb inside a column of a Munich Bierkeller, Georg Elser (Christian Friedel) attempts to cross into neutral Switzerland but is caught at the border. His bomb detonates but misses killing German leader Adolf Hitler by just 13 minutes.

The German security services find incriminating evidence on Elser and link him to the assassination attempt. They believe Elser must have been working with a group of conspirators and proceed to torture Elser. They also round up members of his family from his home village, including Else Härlen (Katharina Schüttler), a married woman Elser has been seeing.

When Else is brought before Elser, he fears for her life and tells Kripo police chief Arthur Nebe (Burghart Klaußner) and Gestapo head Heinrich Müller (Johann von Bülow) that he acted alone, procuring detonators from a steel factory and stealing dynamite from a nearby quarry. He outlines the two clockwork mechanisms he built to time the explosion and hopefully kill Hitler as he made a speech. Still not believed to have attempted the assassination alone, Elser is once more tortured using drugs (Pervitin), but with the same result as before—he insists that he acted alone.

Through flashbacks it is learned that Elser came to despise the Nazis and saw that Hitler needed to be removed to save Germany. Following his arrest, Elser was kept in concentration camps for five years and was shot a few days before American forces liberated Dachau concentration camp, a few weeks before the war ended. In his last days he hears that Arthur Nebe has been killed for his part in the July assassination plot.

Elser is now regarded as a German resistance hero of the Second World War.

Cast

 Christian Friedel as Georg Elser
 Katharina Schüttler as Else Härlen
 Burghart Klaußner as Arthur Nebe
  as Heinrich Müller
  as Eberle
  as Josef Schurr
  as Erich
  as SS Obergruppenführer
  as Maria Elser
 Martin Maria Abram as Ludwig Elser
  as Franz Xaver Lechner

Critical reception
The film has been received generally positively by critics, holding a  approval rating on Rotten Tomatoes. The site's critical consensus reads, "13 Minutes explores an oft-neglected corner of World War II history with just enough craft and narrative momentum to offset a disappointing lack of subtlety." The review in The Guardian newspaper noted the film as "...a heartfelt study of a man who tried to kill Hitler" The newspaper was also very complimentary about Christian Friedel's performance as Elser.

However, the entertainment magazine Variety were less impressed, saying "... the absence of subtlety combined with predictable dollops of sentimentalism once again trivialize events in the name of making them understandable". In  The Daily Telegraphs review, the reviewer noted the film as having an "...overbearing sentimentalism and lacquered, Oscar-hungry sheen".

References

External links
 

2015 films
2010s historical films
2010s German-language films
German historical films
Films about the German Resistance
Films about assassinations
Films directed by Oliver Hirschbiegel
Films scored by David Holmes (musician)
2010s German films